β-Lysine (3,6-diaminohexanoic acid) is an amino acid produced by platelets during coagulation and is directly antibacterial by causing lysis of many Gram positive bacteria by acting as a cationic detergent.

References

Amino acids
Diamines